The Darling Tennis Center (DTC) or the Amanda and Stacy Darling Tennis Center is a multi court facility completed in 2005 that is used for community activities and junior to senior tournaments for the Association of Tennis Professionals and the USTA. The courts are operated by the City of Las Vegas as a part of the Charlie Kellogg and Joe Zaher Sports Complex. In 2019, a new indoor clay court complex has been planned to be built in the future.

The center was the home to the Tennis Channel Open and is the largest tennis center in the state of Nevada.

Facilities 
Stadium court
 23 total courts (3 being converted to clay)
Future indoor center
Pro shop
Restaurant

See also
 List of tennis stadiums by capacity

References

External links 
 Darling Tennis Center

Sports venues completed in 2005
Buildings and structures in Las Vegas
Tennis in Las Vegas
Tennis venues in Nevada
2005 establishments in Nevada
Sports venues in Las Vegas